SCSA may refer to:

 The California State and Consumer Services Agency
 The VSR V8 Trophy Series, the British version of NASCAR, formerly known as ASCAR, Days of Thunder Series and Stock Car Speed Association (SCSA)
 Secure Content Storage Association, a computing abbreviation 
 SwissCham Southern Africa (SCSA)
 The School Curriculum and Standards Authority, the authority responsible for regulating curriculum and standards in Western Australian schools
 Stone Cold Steve Austin